Christophe Cervoni is a French film producer.

Filmography
 Qui cherche trouve, (short, 2001)
 Girlfriends, (2006)
 Le café du pont, (2010)
 De l'huile sur le feu, (2011)
 Hénaut président, (2012)
 Möbius, (2013)
 Babysitting, (2014)
 Le criquet, (short, 2014)
 Babysitting 2, (2015)
 Sophiloscope, (short, 2017)
 Épouse-moi mon pote, (2017)
 Comment tuer sa mère, (2018)
 Nicky Larson et le Parfum de Cupidon, (2018)
 30 jours max, (2020)

References 

French film producers